Gabb's snail also known as the San Clemente Island snail, scientific name Micrarionta gabbii, is a species of air-breathing land snail, a terrestrial pulmonate gastropod mollusk in the family Helminthoglyptidae.

This species is endemic to the United States.  Its natural habitat is temperate shrubland. It is threatened by habitat loss.

References

Molluscs of the United States
Micrarionta
Gastropods described in 1864
Taxonomy articles created by Polbot